The ceremonial county of Suffolk has returned seven MPs to the UK Parliament since 1997.

Number of seats 
The table below shows the number of MPs representing Suffolk at each major redistribution of seats affecting the county.

1Prior to 1950, seats were classified as County Divisions or Parliamentary Boroughs. Since 1950, they have been classified as County or Borough Constituencies.

2The Borough of Sudbury disenfranchised for corruption.

Timeline

Boundary reviews

See also 

 List of parliamentary constituencies in Suffolk

References 

Parliamentary constituencies in Suffolk (historic)